Lebanon participated in the 2011 Asian Winter Games in Almaty and Astana, Kazakhstan from January 30, 2011 to February 6, 2011.

Alpine skiing

Men
Tarek Fenianos
Philippe Araman

References

Nations at the 2011 Asian Winter Games
Asian Winter Games
Lebanon at the Asian Winter Games